Nicoline Sachmann (born 4 September 1997) is a Danish female rhythmic gymnast, representing her nation at international competitions.

She competed at  the  2015 World Rhythmic Gymnastics World Championships, 2017 World Rhythmic Gymnastics World Championships,  and  2018 World Rhythmic Gymnastics World Championships.

References

External links 
 2017: SACHMANN Nicoline DEN - International Gymnastics Federation (fig-photos.com)
 NICOLINE SACHMANN DENMARK DURING RHYTHMIC GYMNASTICS | Shutterstock
 Nicoline SACHMANN (DEN) 2015 Rhythmic Worlds Stuttgart - Qualifications Hoop - FIG Channel

1997 births
Living people
20th-century Danish women
21st-century Danish women